The 2011–12 Wichita State Shockers men's basketball team represented Wichita State University in the 2011–12 NCAA Division I men's basketball season. The team, played in the Missouri Valley Conference, and were led by fifth-year head coach Gregg Marshall. The Shockers played their home games at Charles Koch Arena. They finished with a 16–2 conference record to be crowned Missouri Valley Conference regular season champions. In the 2012 Missouri Valley Conference Tournament, they beat Indiana State in the quarterfinals before losing to Illinois State in the semifinals. They received an at-large bid to the 2012 NCAA Division I men's basketball tournament for their first NCAA Tournament appearance since 2006 and earned No. 5 seed in the South Region where they were defeated by VCU in the second round to end the season with 27–6 record.

Roster

Preseason
The team plays their home games at the Charles Koch Arena, which has a capacity of 10,506. They are in their 67th season as a member of the Missouri Valley Conference. Coming back from their 2010–11 season, they compiled a record of 29–8 and are 2011 National Invitation Tournament Champions.

Departures

Class of 2011 Recruits

Schedule

|-
!colspan=12 style="background:#000; color:#F9D616;"| Exhibition
|-

|-
!colspan=12 style="background:#000; color:#F9D616;"| Regular Season
|-

|-
!colspan=12 style="background:#000; color:#F9D616;"| State Farm MVC Tournament
|-

|-
!colspan=12 style="background:#000; color:#F9D616;"| NCAA Tournament
|-

Rankings

References

Wichita State Shockers men's basketball seasons
Wichita State
Wichita State
Shock
Shock